Viktor Kostiantynovych Shylovsky (born in 1911 in Yuzovka; died in 1973 in Moscow) was a Soviet football player and participant of the 1937 Workers' Summer Olympiad with FC Spartak Moscow.

Honours
 USSR champion: 1924
Dynamo Kyiv
 Cup of the Ukrainian SSR: 1936
He holds the record number of goals scored in finals – 5. He played in three finals (1936, 1937, 1938).

International career
Shylovsky played in several unofficial games for USSR and Ukraine.

External links
  Profile
 Biography at the Kopanyi-myach.info

1911 births
1973 deaths
Sportspeople from Donetsk
People from Bakhmutsky Uyezd
Soviet Top League players
FC Dynamo Stalino players
FC Dynamo Dnipropetrovsk players
FC Dynamo Kyiv players
FC Dynamo Kyiv managers
FC Saturn Ramenskoye managers
Ukrainian footballers
Soviet footballers
Association football forwards
Ukrainian football managers
Soviet football managers